Ulsoor, or Halasuru, is one of the oldest neighbourhoods in the city of Bangalore.  It is located in central Bangalore, and begins roughly near the eastern terminus of MG Road. It is renowned for its numerous temples and market.

History and name
The village of Bangalore is said to have been gifted to Kempe Gowda I (1513–1569) by the Vijayanagar emperors. The Ulsoor Lake was built by his successor, Kempe Gowda II, and is the only surviving tank built by the Gowda kings in Bangalore.   The first British military station was set up in Halasuru in 1807.

There used to be a jackfruit orchard near the Ulsoor Lake, and the Kannada name for jackfruit being 'Halasina Hannu', the area came to be known as Halasuru. During the British rule, the name was anglicised to 'Ulsoor'.

Demographics 
The population of Ulsoor consists mainly of Kannada speaking population and also few other lingual with a considerable Tamil speaking minority population.

Population:	35891
Male:	20526
Female:	15365
Area (sq. km):	1.68

Location in Context

Bangalore Metro Rail
There are two Bangalore Metro Rail stations located in Ulsoor:
Ulsoor (Located on Old Madras Road, at the end closer to CMH Road)
Trinity (Located at Trinity Circle)

See also

Halasuru Someshwara Temple
Indiranagar
Sri Subrahmanya Temple, Halasuru
Ulsoor lake

References

Neighbourhoods in Bangalore
Bangalore Civil and Military Station